Appointment with Love (translit. Maw`ed Gharam) is a 1956 Egyptian romance/musical film directed and co-written by the Egyptian film director Henry Barakat. It stars Abdel Halim Hafez, Faten Hamama, Rushdy Abaza, Zahrat El-Ola, and Imad Hamdi.

Plot 

Faten Hamama plays Nawal, a journalist who meets Samir, a young man. She encourages him to pursue a singing career and he does. He starts a successful career and becomes famous. Nawal gets paralyzed and, not willing to hinder his progress, tries to end their relationship without telling him the truth. Samir finds about the truth. Recognizing her great sacrifice, he returns to her and marries her.

Main cast 

Faten Hamama as Nawal
Abdel Halim Hafez as Samir
Imad Hamdi as Kamal
Zahrat El-Ola as Zahrah
Rushdy Abaza

References

External links 
 

1956 films
1950s Arabic-language films
Egyptian romantic musical films
1950s romantic musical films
Egyptian black-and-white films